The 2017 Toyota Tundra 250 was the fourth stock car race of the 2017 NASCAR Camping World Truck Series and the 17th iteration of the event. The race was held on Friday, May 12, 2017, in Kansas City, Kansas at Kansas Speedway, a  permanent D-shaped oval racetrack. The race took the scheduled 167 laps to complete. At race's end, Kyle Busch, driving for Kyle Busch Motorsports, would inherit the win after leader Ben Rhodes would blow an engine with six to go. The win was Busch's 47th career NASCAR Camping World Truck Series win and his first of the season. To fill out the podium, Johnny Sauter of GMS Racing and John Hunter Nemechek of NEMCO Motorsports would finish second and third, respectively.

Background 

Kansas Speedway is a 1.5-mile (2.4 km) tri-oval race track in Kansas City, Kansas. It was built in 2001 and hosts two annual NASCAR race weekends. The NTT IndyCar Series also raced there until 2011. The speedway is owned and operated by the International Speedway Corporation.

Entry list 

 (R) denotes rookie driver.
 (i) denotes driver who is ineligible for series driver points.

Practice

First practice 
The first practice session was held on Thursday, May 11, at 2:00 PM CST, and would last for 55 minutes.

Second and final practice 
The second and final practice session, sometimes referred to as Happy Hour, was held on Thursday, May 11, at 4:00 PM CST, and would last for 55 minutes.

Qualifying 
Qualifying was held on Friday, May 12, at 3:35 PM CST. Since Kansas Speedway is at least a 1.5 miles (2.4 km) racetrack, the qualifying system was a single car, single lap, two round system where in the first round, everyone would set a time to determine positions 13–32. Then, the fastest 12 qualifiers would move on to the second round to determine positions 1–12.

No drivers would fail to qualify.

Full qualifying results

Race results 
Stage 1 Laps: 40

Stage 2 Laps: 40

Stage 3 Laps: 87

Standings after the race 

Drivers' Championship standings

Note: Only the first 8 positions are included for the driver standings.

References 

2017 NASCAR Camping World Truck Series
NASCAR races at Kansas Speedway
May 2017 sports events in the United States
2017 in sports in Kansas